Neu Gaarz is a village and a former municipality of the Mecklenburgische Seenplatte district, in Mecklenburg-Vorpommern, Germany. Since 1 January 2015 it has been part of the municipality of Jabel.

References

Villages in Mecklenburg-Western Pomerania